The 2005 FIRA Women's European Championship was jointly hosted by Germany and
Bosnia and Herzegovina. Only seven teams took part.

Tournament

Pool A
Pool A was held in Hamburg, Germany from April 7-9.

Semi-finals

3rd/4th Place

Final

Pool B
Pool B was held at Zenica, Bosnia from May 21-23.

Final table

Round one

Round two

See also
Women's international rugby

External links
FIRA website

2005
2005 rugby union tournaments for national teams
International rugby union competitions hosted by Germany
International sports competitions hosted by Bosnia and Herzegovina
2004–05 in European women's rugby union
2004–05 in German rugby union